Manuel Martín or Martin may refer to:

 Manuel Ángel Martín (born 1980), Spanish boccia player
 Manuel Martín (weightlifter) (born 1977), Spanish weightlifter
 Manuel Martín, Jr. (1934–2002), theater director
 Manuel Martín Madrid (born 1938), Spanish architect
 José Manuel Martín (1924–2006), Spanish actor
 Manuel Martin (soccer) (1917–1997), American soccer player-coach
 Manuel Martin (conquistador), Spanish nobleman and conquistador